David Neal (13 February 1932 – 27 June 2000) was a British television actor, active from the 1960s into the 1990s. He is chiefly remembered for a range of supporting roles in major productions.

Multiple supporting roles in popular television
Although very rarely cast in a lead role, David Neal had significant supporting roles in episodes of a range of popular British television series, including Softly, Softly, Z-Cars, Doctor Who, Inspector Morse, Poirot, The Bill, Wycliffe and Noah's Castle. He also did radio voice work.

Classical acting
David Neal worked in a broad range of roles during his career. In 1970 he took a major supporting role (Cinna) in the all-star feature film of Shakespeare's Julius Caesar (which starred Charlton Heston, Christopher Lee, Richard Chamberlain, Diana Rigg and Sir John Gielgud). A few years later (in 1979) he secured another significant supporting role as Richard le Scrope, Archbishop of York in both Henry IV, Part 1 and Henry IV, Part 2 in the BBC's major 'complete works of Shakespeare' series of television films. He later appeared in Jonathan Miller's productions of Timon of Athens and Antony and Cleopatra for the same series.

The Flockton Flyer 
Although Neal is not remembered for lead roles, an exception is the 1970s' children's television production The Flockton Flyer, written by Peter Whitbread, in which he played the principal character, Bob Carter. The programme ran to two series, with an associated paperback novel. He later played the lead role of the father in the 1980 TV series Noah's Castle with Simon Gipps-Kent and Mike Reid.

Filmography

References

External links

English male stage actors
English male film actors
English male television actors
British male Shakespearean actors
2000 deaths
1932 births
20th-century British male actors